Glycia is a genus of beetles in the family Carabidae, containing the following species:

 Glycia afgana Jedlicka, 1956
 Glycia bimaculata Bedel, 1907
 Glycia klapperichi Jedlicka, 1956
 Glycia rufolimbata Maindron, 1905
 Glycia spencei (Gistel, 1838)
 Glycia unicolor Chaudoir, 1848

References

Lebiinae